Cube is a 2021 Japanese science fiction horror film written by Koji Tokuo and directed by Yasuhiko Shimizu. It is a remake of the 1997 Canadian film of the same name, the first film in the Cube series. The film stars Masaki Suda, Anne Watanabe, Masaki Okada, Hikaru Tashiro, Takumi Saito and Kōtarō Yoshida. It was released in Japan on October 22, 2021.

Cast
 Masaki Suda as Yuichi Goto, a 29-year-old engineer. He is based on David Worth from the original film.
 Anne Watanabe as Asako Kai, a 37-year-old staff employee. She is based on Joan Leaven from the original film.
 Masaki Okada as Shinji Ochi, a 31-year-old freeter. He is based on Dr. Helen Holloway from the original film.
 Hikaru Tashiro as Chiharu Uno, a 13-year-old middle school student. He is based on Kazan from the original film.
 Tokio Emoto as First Man, an unnamed prisoner. He is based on Alderson from the original film.
 Takumi Saito as Hiroshi Ide, a 41-year-old mechanic. He is based on Rennes from the original film.
 Kōtarō Yoshida as Kazumasa Ando, a 62-year-old company executive. He is based on Quentin McNeil from the original film.

Plot 
A man wakes up in a mysterious and cold cube-shaped room. He finds hatches on each side, leading to different rooms. Upon entering a room, he is suddenly impaled by a large metal square, which retracts, taking out a square chunk from his body.

Three people, Goto, Uno, and Ochi wake up in a mysterious room. None of them can seem to recall how or why they got here. A woman, Kai, enters the room, as well as a man named Ide. They all have no memory or recollection of how they got here. Ochi, out of fear tries to escape, but Ide warns him there are traps as he tosses a boot into the room, setting off flamethrowers.

Production
Filming took place in October and November 2019.

Critical response

James Marsh, writing for the South China Morning Post, gave the film 2 out of 5 stars, and summarized: "The movie is so repetitive and sluggish, and the characters so insufferable, that being stuck in the deadly cube might seem preferable to watching it"

Particularly from viewers who had seen the original version of the Cube, the 2021 film suffered poor reviews on various movie review platforms. At the end of January 2023, the film had an IMDb rating of 4.5 / 10 from the weighted average votes 1,272 IMDb users.

References

External links
 

2021 films
2021 science fiction horror films
2020s Japanese films
Aeon Entertainment films
Cube (film series)
Films scored by Yutaka Yamada
Horror film remakes
Japanese remakes of foreign films
Japanese science fiction horror films
Science fiction film remakes
Shochiku films
2020s Canadian films